Tahar El Materi (born in 1932/ died in 2021) is a Tunisian businessman. He established Al Adwya, one of Tunisia’s biggest private pharmaceutical companies, with his brother Moncef El Materi in the 1980s.

References

1932 births
Tunisian people of Turkish descent
20th-century Tunisian businesspeople
Living people